Benjamin Pickard, usually Ben Pickard (26 or 28 February 1842 – 3 February 1904), was a British coal miner, trade unionist and Lib–Lab politician.

Early life and family
Pickard was born in Kippax near Leeds in the West Riding of Yorkshire the son of a collier. He started work as a pit-boy at the age of twelve years. He earned a reputation as a studious boy and attended Kippax School. He also received religious training as a Wesleyan, becoming a local preacher and was connected with the Lord's Rest Day Association throughout his life. He was associated from an early age with the trade union movement becoming lodge secretary at the age of sixteen. In 1864 he married Hannah Elizabeth Freeman of Kippax and they had four sons and four daughters. His wife died in 1901.

Trade union official
In 1873 Pickard was appointed assistant secretary of the West Yorkshire Miners' Association and in 1876 he became secretary. He was responsible for uniting the West and South Yorkshire Miners' Associations into one body in 1881 and became the first secretary of the Yorkshire Miners' Association. In 1877 he was assistant secretary of the Miners' National Union and was a leading player in the foundation of the Miners' Federation of Great Britain, of which he was elected the first president.

In 1893 Pickard led the miners in the biggest industrial dispute the country had hitherto seen. The result of the combined strike and lockout was the establishment of a Board of Conciliation to address problems arising in the industry and most disputes over the coming years were settled using this machinery. He played an active part in obtaining legislation in the mining industry including the Eight Hours Bill, restricting the hours miners could work underground, although it did not become law until after his death.

International work
Pickard was active in establishing the International Federation of Mineworkers in 1890. He organised six international congresses of miners from Britain, Germany, Austria, France and Belgium which were held in Paris, Jolimont near La Louvière, Brussels, Berlin, Aix-la-Chapelle and London.  He also attended about eighteen Trade Union Congresses. In 1897 his interest in arbitration and the work of the Peace Society led to his inclusion in a peace deputation to Grover Cleveland, President of the United States.

Politics
In addition to his commitment to the interests of organised labour, Pickard was known as an 'ardent liberal'. He served as a member of the Wakefield School Board from 1881 until 1885 and in 1889 was appointed an alderman of the West Riding County Council on which he was a co-opted member. He was re-elected alderman in 1895 and 1901.

In 1885 the Yorkshire Miners Association came to an agreement with the Liberal Party allowing the association to nominate the candidate for elections to Parliament for the Normanton division of Yorkshire, a constituency in which more than 60% of the electorate were coal miners. Pickard was selected and won the seat at each election under this arrangement from 1885 until his death in 1904. In return he generally supported the Liberals in Parliament.

Death
Pickard died of heart failure in Westminster in 1904 aged 61, having been ill for some time.

References

Obituary in The Times, 4 February 1904
Who was Who, Oxford University Press, 2007

External links 
 

Liberal-Labour (UK) politicians
Liberal Party (UK) MPs for English constituencies
Members of the Parliamentary Committee of the Trades Union Congress
UK MPs 1885–1886
UK MPs 1886–1892
UK MPs 1892–1895
UK MPs 1895–1900
UK MPs 1900–1906
Presidents of the National Union of Mineworkers (Great Britain)
1904 deaths
1842 births
People from Kippax, West Yorkshire